Martin Scorsese Presents The Blues: Keb' Mo' is a blues album by Keb' Mo', it was released in 2003 as part of Martin Scorsese's The Blues documentary series.

Track listing 
 "Soon As I Get Paid" (Moore, Parker) - 4:37
 "Come on in My Kitchen" (Johnson) - 4:08
 "Perpetual Blues Machine" (Graper, Moore) - 3:15
 "Don't Try to Explain" (Moore) - 3:57
 "I'm on Your Side" (Moore) - 3:39
 "Henry" (Moore, Parker) - 5:18
 "Am I Wrong" (Moore) - 2:19
 "A Letter to Tracy" (Moore, Parker) - 4:10
 "Love in Vain" (Johnson) - 3:04
 "Dirty Low Down and Bad" (Moore) - 3:09
 "Every Morning" (Moore) - 2:58
 "Dangerous Mood" (Moore, Parton) - 4:59
 "It Hurts Me" (James, Sehorn) - 5:27
 "Crapped Out Again" (Moore, Parker) - 2:32
 "Love Blues" (Moore, Powell) - 3:02
 "Peace of Mind" (King, Moore) - 4:11

References

Keb' Mo' albums
Television soundtracks
2003 compilation albums
2003 soundtrack albums